The Prévost reaction is chemical reaction in which an alkene is converted by iodine and the silver salt of benzoic acid to a vicinal diol with anti stereochemistry. The reaction was discovered by the French chemist Charles Prévost (1899–1983).

Reaction mechanism 
The reaction between silver benzoate (1) and iodine is very fast and produces a very reactive iodinium benzoate intermediate (2).  The reaction of the iodinium salt (2) with an alkene gives another short-lived iodinium salt (3).  Nucleophilic substitution (SN2) by the benzoate salt gives the ester (4).  Another silver ion causes the neighboring group substitution of the benzoate ester to give the oxonium salt (5).  A second SN2 substitution by the benzoate anion gives the desired diester (6).

In the final step hydrolysis of the ester groups gives the anti-diol. This outcome is the opposite of that of the related Woodward cis-hydroxylation which gives syn addition.

References

See also 
 Woodward cis-hydroxylation

Organic redox reactions
Substitution reactions
Name reactions